"Riot" is a song by American hip hop recording artist 2 Chainz. It was first released as part of his mixtape T.R.U. REALigion (2011) and was later released as part of the deluxe edition of his debut studio album Based on a T.R.U. Story (2012), at a time four seconds longer than its time on the mixtape.

Music video
On 4th September, 2012, the music video was officially released. It was shot at night time in Atlanta and directed by Decatur Dan. The video includes Chainz being the leader of a group of unruly rebels that destroy cars and start fires.

Charts

Certifications

References

External links

2011 songs
2012 songs
2 Chainz songs
Songs written by 2 Chainz
Songs written by DJ Spinz